National Route 380 is a national highway of Japan connecting Yawatahama, Ehime and Kumakōgen, Ehime in Japan, with a total length of 66.8 km (41.51 mi).

References

National highways in Japan
Roads in Ehime Prefecture